Gaius Claudius Centho or Cento was a 3rd-century BC member of a prominent and wealthy patrician Roman Republican family. He was the third son of Appius Claudius Caecus, and a member of the Claudii. He was consul in the year 240 BC.  He was Roman censor in 225, interrex in 217, and Roman dictator in 213. 

Though little is known about his life, Cicero mentions his consulship in his Tusculanae Disputationes, and Livy mentions his service as interrex, after which Publius Cornelius Scipio Asina oversaw the election of Lucius Aemilius Paullus and Gaius Terentius Varro as consuls for 216 BC. He was appointed dictator by the consul Tiberius Sempronius Gracchus in order to oversee the election of new consuls in 213 BC.

Notes

Centho, Gaius
3rd-century BC Roman consuls
Ancient Roman dictators
Roman censors
Roman patricians